Gillian Barge (born Gillian Betty Bargh, 27 May 1940 – 19 November 2003) was an English stage, television and film actress.

She was born in Hastings, Sussex. She started acting at the age of 17, training at the Birmingham Theatre School.

Barge's stage roles included The Cherry Orchard (as Varya), Measure For Measure (Isabella) and The Winter's Tale (Paulina). In 2001, she was nominated for a Laurence Olivier Theatre Award as Best Supporting Actress for her performance in Passion Play at the Donmar Warehouse. Gillian was also a member of the Royal National Theatre.

In addition to her theatre work, Barge has numerous television appearances to her credit. These include guest appearances on episodes of Pie in the Sky (1996), Lovejoy (1994), Midsomer Murders (2002), One Foot in the Grave(1990), All Creatures Great and Small (1980), Van der Valk (1977), Softly, Softly (1972) and also in the BBC Television Shakespeare production of King Lear starring as Goneril in 1982. 

Her film credits include The National Health (1973). She portrayed Gertrude Bell in the TV movie, A Dangerous Man: Lawrence After Arabia (1990).  

Her second husband was the actor Clive Merrison. 

In 2003, at age 63, she died of cancer.

Selected film and television roles
Film credits include:
The National Health (1973) - Dr. Bird
Seal Island (1976) - Warden's Wife
Singleton's Pluck (1984) - Gwen
Mesmer (1994) - Frau Mesmer
The Discovery of Heaven (2001) - Onno's mother
Charlotte Gray (2001) - Madame Galliot
Love Actually (2003) - Cabinet Minister
Money Kills (2012) - Helga (final film role)

Television credits include:
King Lear (1982) - Goneril
A Dangerous Man: Lawrence After Arabia (1990) (TV) - Gertrude Bell
One Foot in the Grave (1990) 'The Eternal Quadrangle as 'Mrs Doreen Mauleverer'
Agatha Christie's Poirot - The Mysterious Affair at Styles (1990) - Emily Inglethorp
Miss Marple: They Do It with Mirrors (1991) - Mildred Strete
A Dance to the Music of Time (1997) - Mrs Erdleigh
The Uninvited (1997) - Mary Madigan
Doomwatch: Winter Angel (1999) - Cheryl
The Ruth Rendell Mysteries - The Lake of Darkness (1999) (TV) - Mrs Urban
Peak Practice (1999 episode: The First Stone) - Grace Longfield
Anna Karenina (2000) - Princess Shcherbatskaya
The Jury (2002) - Eva Prohaska / Juror No.9
Midsomer Murders (2002 episode: A Worm in the Bud) - Hannah Harrington

References

External links and references

Obituary by Peter Gill

1940 births
2003 deaths
Actresses from Sussex
Deaths from cancer in England
English film actresses
English stage actresses
English television actresses
People from Hastings